Acanthosyris is a genus of plants in the family Santalaceae. It contains the following species:
 Acanthosyris annonagustata C.Ulloa & P.M.Jørg.
 Acanthosyris asipapote M.Nee
 Acanthosyris falcata Griseb.
 Acanthosyris glabrata (Stapf) Stauffer ex Govaerts
 Acanthosyris paulo-alvinii G.M.Barroso
 Acanthosyris spinescens (Mart. & Eichler) Griseb.

References

Santalaceae
Santalales genera
Taxonomy articles created by Polbot